El Imparcial is used as a newspaper name in some Spanish-speaking countries:

Argentina
El Imparcial (Chascomús)
Mexico

El Imparcial (Oaxaca)
Puerto Rico
El Imparcial (Puerto Rico) (online new edition)
Spain
El Imparcial (Madrid)
United States

Venezuela
El Imparcial (Caracas)